The 1996 FIBA Europe Under-20 Championship (known at that time as 1996 European Championship for Men 22 and Under') was the third edition of the FIBA Europe Under-20 Championship. The cities of Bursa and Istanbul, in Turkey, hosted the tournament. Lithuania won their first title.

Qualification

Squads

Preliminary round
The twelve teams were allocated in two groups of six teams each.

Group A

Group B

Knockout stage

9th–12th playoffs

5th–8th playoffs

Championship

Winning roster:
 Tomas Masiulis (PF)
 Evaldas Jocys (F/C)
 Nerijus Karlikanovas (F)
 Mindaugas Timinskas (G/F)
 Kęstutis Šeštokas (F)
 Ramūnas Petraitis (PG)
 Kęstutis Marčiulionis (PG)
 Dainius Adomaitis (G/F)
 Giedrius Aidietis (C)
 Šarūnas Jasikevičius (PG)
 Andrius Jurkūnas (PF)
 Virginijus Praškevičius (F/C)

Final standings

References
FIBA Archive
FIBA Europe Archive

 
FIBA U20 European Championship
1996–97 in European basketball
1996–97 in Turkish basketball
1996